The National Review was a quarterly British magazine published between 1855 and 1864.  The magazine was founded and joint-edited by journalists Walter Bagehot and Richard Holt Hutton.

It published one of the first reviews of Charles Darwin's Origin of Species, by William Benjamin Carpenter.

References

External links
National Review, hathitrust.org
National Review (1855-1864) collection, at the Internet Archive

Quarterly magazines published in the United Kingdom
Defunct magazines published in the United Kingdom
Magazines established in 1855
Magazines disestablished in 1864
1855 establishments in the United Kingdom